The Goddess of Lost Lake is a 1918 American silent era drama film starring Louise Glaum, Lawson Butt, and Hayward Mack.

Directed by Wallace Worsley and produced by Louise Glaum and Robert Bunton through her production company, the Louise Glaum Organization, in association with Robert Brunton Productions, the screenplay was adapted by Jack Cunningham based on a story by M. Van de Water.

This film is now lost.

Plot
The story is about a young woman who is a quarter Native American Indian, Mary Thorne (Glaum), who returns to the home of her prospector father, Marshall Thorne (Dowling), after completing her education in the East. She has a college degree and an air of refinement.

While her father is away hunting for gold at Lost Lake, Mary enjoys the freedom of his mountain cabin. When two hunters on a hunting expedition, Mark Hamilton (Butt) and Chester Martin (Mack), show up and visit the cabin she decides to put on Indian clothing and pretend she is a full-blooded Indian princess for fun. Both men are attracted to the Indian maiden and Hamilton falls deeply in love with her. Martin, however, is contemptuous of her Indian background. When Mary hears him making derisive remarks about the Indian race, she returns to her father's cabin.

Martin follows her home, enters her bedroom, and attacks her. Hamilton comes to her rescue and prevents Martin from raping her. He then looks around the room and sees the modern decor. Realizing that Mary is a young woman of culture and education, he becomes angry because she fooled him and leaves. Meanwhile, while Mary's father is searching for gold, which legend has it is at the bottom of Lost Lake, a legend that also says a white man who once stole some of the gold killed an Indian prince and a white man's blood must fall before anymore gold can be taken, he is killed by an Indian guard at Lost Lake.

Mary inherits the gold that her father discovered. Hamilton, who cannot forget her, comes back and they are married.

Cast
Louise Glaum as Mary Thorne
Lawson Butt as Mark Hamilton
Hayward Mack as Chester Martin
Joseph J. Dowling as Marshall Thorne
Frank Lanning as Eagle

Reception
Like many American films of the time, The Goddess of Lost Lake was subject to restrictions and cuts by city and state film censorship boards. For example, the Chicago Board of Censors required a cut, in Reel 5, of the intertitle "I've as good right as you".

Production
Scenes for The Goddess of Lost Lake were filmed at Big Bear Lake and the Pinecrest Resort in the San Bernardino Mountains.

References

External links

The Goddess of Lost Lake at the AFI Catalog of Feature Films

1918 films
Silent American drama films
American silent feature films
American black-and-white films
Censored films
1918 drama films
Lost American films
Films directed by Wallace Worsley
Films distributed by W. W. Hodkinson Corporation
Films shot in California
1918 lost films
Lost drama films
1910s American films